"Castle on the Hill" is a 2017 song by Ed Sheeran.

Castle on the Hill or The Castle on the Hill may also refer to:

Music
"Castle on the Hill", a 1996 song by Ride from Tarantula

Books
Castle on the Hill, novel by W. E. D. Ross (1968)
The Castle on the Hill, novel by Elizabeth Goudge (1941)

Buildings

United States
Baltimore City College, Baltimore, Maryland
Fairhaven High School and Academy, Fairhaven, Massachusetts
The High School of Music & Art, a former school in New York City, now the A. Philip Randolph Campus High School
Hillcrest Lutheran Academy, Fergus Falls, Minnesota
Lincoln College Preparatory Academy, Kansas City, Missouri
Monastery Immaculate Conception, Ferdinand Indian
Northwestern Oklahoma State University, Alva, Oklahoma; the first building destroyed in a 1935 fire
Reading High School (Reading, Pennsylvania), a high school in Reading, Pennsylvania
Shelton-McMurphey-Johnson House, a Victorian-era residence in Eugene, Oregon
Sioux City Central High School and Central Annex, Sioux City, Iowa
Teaneck High School, Teaneck, New Jersey
Castle on the Hill, a former water purification facility in Dansville, Livingston County, New York

Elsewhere
Melbourne High School, a selective entry state high school for boys in the Melbourne suburb of South Yarra, Australia
St Eunan's College, County Donegal, Ireland

See also
Castle Hill (disambiguation)
Hill castle